Lena Johanna Gercke (born 29 February 1988) is a German fashion model and television host. She won the first season of Germany's Next Topmodel and was the host of Austria's Next Topmodel (seasons 1–4).

Early life
Gercke was born in Marburg and grew up in Cloppenburg, where she attended Liebfrauenschule Cloppenburg (ULF), a Roman Catholic Gymnasium, completing her Abitur in 2007. Gercke is an amateur chess player. She has a sister and two paternal half-sisters.

Career

Modelling

On 14 August 2004, Gercke won a casting call for fast food chain Burger King. She was represented by Langer-Pueschel who booked her for photoshoots, catwalk shows, and dance performances. At the beginning of 2006, she attended a casting call for Germany's Next Topmodel hosted by Heidi Klum. Upon winning the competition, she received an advertising contract with the fashion label OuiSet, a modeling contract with IMG Models in Paris, the cover shoot for the June 2006 issue of German Cosmopolitan and an advertising contract with Microsoft for Windows Live. She also appeared in magazines such as the American issues of Cosmopolitan, Sports Week, Glamour and on the cover of French Votre Beauté. 
She was featured in print campaigns of H&M, Mexx and Geox. In 2010, she walked on New York Fashion Week for the Spring season of Custo Barcelona.

Television

In 2013, Gercke became a judge on Das Supertalent. In 2014, her sister joined the show for a surprise audition. In 2015, she hosted the prime time hidden camera show Prankenstein. From 2015 to 2021, she present with Thore Schölermann the talent show on ProSieben and on Sat.1 The Voice of Germany and from 2018 they present The Voice Senior on Sat.1.

Personal life
Gercke's relationship with a film director, Dustin Schöne, became known in April 2019. They have two daughters (born 2020 and 2022).

References

External links

Lena Gercke in the Fashion Model Directory

1988 births
Living people
German female models
Germany's Next Topmodel winners
People from Cloppenburg
People from Marburg
German television presenters
German women television presenters
Sat.1 people